Wolfsberg  is a town in Carinthia, Austria, the capital of Wolfsberg District.

Geography
The town is situated within the Lavanttal Alps, west of the Koralpe range in the valley of the Lavant River, a left tributary of the Drava. In the northeast, the road up to the Packsattel mountain pass connects Wolfsberg with Voitsberg in Styria.

The municipality comprises 40 cadastral communities (Surface area in hectares 31. Dezember 2019):

The municipal area is divided into 65 villages (population in brackets as of 1 January 2020):

History

The area of Wolfsberg belonged to the estates within the medieval Duchy of Carinthia that were ceded to the Prince-Bishopric of Bamberg, probably already by Emperor Henry II in 1007. The castle above the town was first mentioned as Wolfsperch in an 1178 deed of St. Paul's Abbey in the Lavanttal. The adjacent settlement became the administrative centre of Bamberg's Carinthian territories and in 1331 received town privileges by Prince-Bishop Werntho Schenk von Reicheneck.

During the Protestant Reformation the Bayerhofen Castle residence, first mentioned in 1239 and rebuilt in the 16th century, became a center of Lutheranism, which nevertheless was suppressed by the Counter-Reformation. In 1759 the Habsburg empress Maria Theresa acquired all Bamberg lands in Carinthia. Wolfsberg Castle was purchased by Count Hugo Henckel von Donnersmarck in 1846 and rebuilt in a Tudorbethan style.

In World War II the village of Priel south of the town center was the site of the Stalag XVIII-A prisoner-of-war camp with about 7,000 inmates. After the war it served as a detention camp run by the British occupation forces.

Politics

Seats in the municipal council (Gemeinderat)  local elections:
Social Democratic Party of Austria (SPÖ): 20
Freedom Party of Austria (FPÖ): 5
Austrian People's Party (ÖVP): 5
NEOS: 3
The Greens – The Green Alternative: 2

Twin towns

Wolfsberg is twinned with:
  Herzogenaurach, Germany
  Várpalota, Hungary

Notable people
 Hermann Schmid (born 1939), actor and director
 Ulrich Habsburg-Lothringen (born 1941), nobleman and politician (The Greens)
 Walter Kogler (born 1967), football player and coach 
 Heinz Arzberger (born 1972), football goalkeeper
 Elisabeth Köstinger (born 1978), politician (ÖVP)
 Patrick Friesacher (born 1980), racing driver 
 Kai Schoppitsch (born 1980), football player
 Christian Prawda (born 1982), football player
 Eva Wutti (born 1989), triathlete and cyclist
The poet Christine Lavant (1915–1973) died in the Wolfsberg state hospital.

References

External links

Official website
Statistical overview (Census 2001)
 Pictures of Wolfsberg

Cities and towns in Wolfsberg District